Symrise AG is a major producer of flavours and fragrances with sales of €3.154 billion in 2018. Major competitors include Döhler, Firmenich, Givaudan, International Flavors and Fragrances, and Takasago International. Symrise is a member of the European Flavour Association. In 2021, Symrise was ranked 4th by FoodTalks' Global Top 50 Food Flavours and Fragrances Companies list.

History
Symrise was founded in 2003 by the merger of Bayer subsidiary Haarmann & Reimer (H&R) and Dragoco, both based in Holzminden, Germany.

Haarman & Reimer
Haarman & Reimer (H&R) was founded in 1874 by chemists Ferdinand Tiemann and Wilhelm Haarmann after they succeeded in first synthesizing vanillin from coniferin. Holzminden was the site where vanillin was first produced industrially.

In 1917, H&R supported Leopold Ružička's unsuccessful three-year project to synthesize irone, a fragrance of violets.

In 1953, H&R was acquired by Bayer.

Dragoco
Dragoco was founded in 1919 by Carl-Wilhelm Gerberding and his cousin August Bellmer. 

Horst-Otto Gerberding, majority holder and Chairman of the Executive Board at Dragoco, placed all of his shares into the new Syrmise corporation and the merger was completed May 23, 2003.

History since 2003
In April 2005, Symrise acquired Flavours Direct, a UK-based manufacturer of compounded flavours and seasonings.

In January 2006, Symrise acquired Hamburg based Kaden Biochemicals GmbH, a producer of specialty botanical extracts.

In November 2006, Symrise announced plans to sell shares worth €650 million in an IPO. The firm also announced that its main shareholders, including EQT, would also sell shares worth an unspecified amount. The IPO would leave well above 50% of Symrise shares in free-float. Deutsche Bank and UBS conducted the listing on December 11, 2006. Symrise was listed on the Frankfurt Stock Exchange with the trading symbol SY1. With 81,030,358 shares issued at an issue price of €17.25 for a total volume of €1.4 billion, it was the largest German public offering of 2006.

On 19 March 2007, Symrise was added to the German MDAX stock index.

In March 2013, Symrise acquired US-owned fragrance manufacturer Belmay Fragrances for an undisclosed sum.

On 12 April 2014, Symrise had announced the acquisition of Diana Group one of the leading manufacturers of natural flavours and the global number 1 for pet food solutions. The transaction was closed on July 29, 2014, and valued at around EUR 1.3 billion of equity and debt.

In November 2020, Symrise announced its purchase agreement with Sensient Technologies Corporation, to acquire its fragrance and aroma business.

Key figures

World market share of the relevant fragrance and flavor market (2015)

Source:

References

External links

Flavor companies
Fragrance companies
Chemical companies of Germany
Companies based in Saxony
Food and drink companies of Germany
Cosmetics companies of Germany
Companies in the MDAX